Mount Fei is a  mountain in the northwest of Jingzhou Miao and Dong Autonomous County, Hunan, China.

History
During the Five Dynasties and Ten Kingdoms period (907–979), King Wumu of Chu, Ma Yin, sent troops to attack Chengzhou (now Jingzhou Miao and Dong Autonomous County), local chiefs Pan Jinsheng and Yang Chenglei resisted the attack by favourable terrain. Now the trenches on the mount are still there. After the death of Yang Zaisi, local people built a temple on the top to commemorate him and called him "Grandpa Mount Fei".

Temples
There are four Buddhist temples and one Taoist temple on the mount, namely Toubaoding, Erbaoding, Sanbaoding, Chan Temple of Mount Fei and Fangguang Temple.

The Toubaoding is situated on the top of the mount. It was originally built in the Yuanfeng period (1078–1085) of the Song dynasty (960–1279) but turned to ashes by a devastating fire in 1899 in the reign of Guangxu Emperor of the Qing dynasty (1644–1911). The present version was completed in 1903.

The Sanbaoding was built in 1693 in the 32nd year of Kangxi period in the Qing dynasty, and it is still intact.

The Chan Temple of Mount Fei was built on the site of former Songyun Chan Temple in 2005. The entire temple faces south with the Shanmen, Four Heavenly Kings Hall, Hall of Yuantong, and the Mahavira Hall along the central axis of the complex.

The Fangguang Temple is located at the foot of the mount, the existing main buildings include the Main Hall, Sanqing Hall, Lingguan Hall and Wangxu Pavilion. Some pieces of stone tablet are displayed in the temple. The Main Hall underwent two renovations, respectively in 1993 and 2001.

References

Bibliography

External links
 

Geography of Huaihua
Tourist attractions in Huaihua
Fei
Jingzhou Miao and Dong Autonomous County